The Minister of Education, Science and Culture is the head of the Ministry of Education, Science and Culture. The current Minister of Education, Science and Culture is Lilja Dögg Alfreðsdóttir.

List of ministers

Minister of Education (16 December 1942 – 1 January 1970)

Minister of Education, Science and Culture (1 January 1970 – present)
The Cabinet of Iceland Act no. 73/1969, which had been passed by the parliament 28 May 1969, took effect on 1 January 1970. Thus the Cabinet was formally established along with its ministries which had up until then not formally existed separately from the ministers.

References

External links
Official website 
Official website 

 Education